The Hannover C.IV was a prototype escort fighter built in Germany during World War I, which formed the basis for a passenger aircraft following the war. Derived from the Hannover CL.II, the C.IV shared the same basic conventional biplane configuration with the unusual biplane tail of that aircraft, but incorporated the overhanging, aerodynamically-balanced ailerons used on the Hannover CL.III. Intended for high-altitude operations, the aircraft was equipped with a far more powerful engine than its predecessors. Structurally it differed in having each wing braced with a pair of I struts that connected two points on the upper wing between the spars, one mid span and one near the tip, to a single point on the lower wing, so that from the front or rear, they appeared as a V, but from the side as an I.

Specifications (C.IV)

References

 
 

1910s German fighter aircraft
Hannover aircraft
Single-engined tractor aircraft
Biplanes